Gravesend Grammar School is a selective grammar school with academy status located in Gravesend, Kent, England. The school accepts boys at age 11 by examination accepting a cohort of the top 15-20% and boys and girls at 16, based on their GCSE results. The school continues to strive achieving around 100%(5 A*-C including English and Maths)  at GCSE level with many students obtaining >9 GCSEs at the end of Year 11.

School
Gravesend Grammar School was opened by Princess Beatrice of Battenberg, youngest daughter of Queen Victoria, on 19 July 1893 with due pomp and ceremony. The school was originally based in Darnley Road, Gravesend and later moved to the site of Milton Hall, the former home of Mayor G. M. Arnold JP, one of the school's founders. The original building is currently used as an adult education centre. The replacement building, erected between 1931 and 1938 and officially opened on 12 October 1938, is still in use. Although many alterations and additions have been made to it since it was originally constructed, including being partly rebuilt after being bombed during World War II, having been mistaken for Eton College.

A second school building, known as the Centenary Building, was built in 1993 to commemorate the school's 100th year and currently houses facilities including multiple computer facilities and chemistry labs. There are a number of mobile classrooms around the school site, used for various subjects, although these are beginning to be replaced by more permanent buildings.

In July 2009 a new sports centre was opened, adjacent to the sports hall, and named the Sanderson Sports Centre, after a former headmaster. Overall, there are 63 classrooms, including six computer rooms, all of which contain interactive whiteboards, as well as a library, a sports hall, several small music practice rooms and a canteen available to all staff and pupils. In 2013 the main school and the Centenary Building were linked by a new building containing eight new classrooms including a large art room and a lecture theatre. In 2016, a new music block was opened opposite a computer facility. This new music block has many new features and is a vast improvement on its predecessor. There are 3 practice rooms, a recording studio and a main room for clubs and other musical activities.

In 2004 the school gained specialist status as a maths and computing specialist school. This guarantees the school extra government funding in order to continue the running and expansion of its facilities. The school also gained language specialist status, in 2008.

In 2019, A £7 million expansion proposed by Gravesend Grammar School was approved. The new expansion includes a new teaching block for Year 12 & 13 students and a new Canteen. This new expansion project would bring the number of new Year 7 students up from 174 to 210 students. Construction of the new Sixth Form block started in 2021 going smoothly. Construction of the Canteen started in March 2022. In July 2022, the project was paused over fire safety concerns due to there being no fire hydrants and reliable water supplies. This equipment had to be installed at an additional cost of £900,000. In November 2022, the new sixth-form building opened whilst the new canteen opened in February 2023. On top of the new expansion, minor improvements have been enforced on the main school building, including roof asbestos removal, and new internal windows.

Chair of the Local Governing Body: Anne Robinson
Headteacher: Malcolm Moaby
Deputy Headteacher: Sarah Tremain. Head of Lower School: Gareth Rapley. Head of Middle School: James Deamer. Head of Senior School: Duncan Pallant. 
Director of Support Services: Michael Fall

On 1 August 2011 the school became an Academy Trust.

Names and styles of the school
1893–1898 : The Gravesend Municipal Technical School
1898–1904 : The Gravesend Municipal Day School
1904–1914 : The Gravesend County Day School
1914–1946 : The County School for Boys, Gravesend
1946–1967 : The Gravesend Grammar School for Boys
1967–1982 : The Gravesend School for Boys
1982–1999 : Gravesend Grammar School for Boys
1999–present : Gravesend Grammar School

House system
In 1926 the present house system was introduced replacing the former houses of Goths, Vikings and Saxons. Originally the pupils in each year group were divided into four houses reflecting where they lived. This distinction no longer applies with the choice of house now often linked to family connections:

 Cliffe (Blue House tie) – deriving from the Overcliffe, for boys from the west of the Borough
 Downs (Yellow House tie) – representing the North Downs, for boys from the south of the Borough
 Hill (Green House Tie) – from Windmill Hill, for boys from the east of the Borough
 Town (Red House tie) – as the name indicates, boys drawn from the town centre

In 1993 to reflect the growing size of the school, a fifth house was established:
 School (Purple House tie)

In 2012 a sixth house was formed:
 Fleet (White House tie)

The 2009-year group also included a Fleet House form. Originally called (Rain)Bow the 30 pupils belonged to the older five houses; in 2012 these pupils received Fleet House ties replacing their original House tie.

Head Boy team and prefects
Each year, a head boy and a team of five deputies are elected from the Lower Sixth (Year 12). Several weeks before the Easter holiday, any student wishing to stand for either position must submit a manifesto to the Head of Year. Hustings are then held, in which the candidates put forward their ideas and reasons for wishing to be elected. The Year 12 group and staff vote then for their choices for head boy and deputies. The candidates with the most votes then have an interview with the headteacher and the successful candidates are announced just before the term ends. As the school now has a mixed Sixth Form the team is also mixed.

There is a number of school prefects, ranging from subject prefects to pastoral ones in charge of areas of the school such as the library or the canteen. All members of the prefect and head boy teams are issued a blue shield-shaped badge engraved with their position.

Sixth form
The Sixth Form currently contains approximately 300 students, studying A Levels in a variety of subjects. Each week there is a "General Education" session for the Lower Sixth, attracting various speakers, such as local MP Adam Holloway or, for example, representatives from Israeli and Palestinian Support Charities. The school also provides free "Driveability" sessions for the Year 12 students that outline the various risks and responsibilities of learning to drive. There are several extracurricular clubs specifically for the Sixth Form, including an A+ computing course, and a Film Club.

Careers
Pupils begin to prepare for career choices in Year 9, where they start to have one lesson a fortnight being taught various aspects of careers, including interview techniques and how to write CVs. These lessons continue until the end of Year 11. In addition, all Year 11 pupils have a week's work experience in a variety of organisations, ranging from local schools to companies in Kent and in London. They also have group careers interviews with a Connexions advisor, with one on one sessions if requested. The school has a Careers Library that any student can use, containing prospectae and information from various universities, as well as information about possible career paths.

Sport
Sport plays a very big part of life at the school with all GCSE students taking physical education short courses. There are a number of specialist PE teachers who coach a variety of teams, including cricket, football, badminton, rugby and hockey, as well as facilities for basketball, table tennis and athletics; handball was introduced in 2010.

The school arranges overseas rugby tours to South Africa, Canada, USA, New Zealand and Hong Kong. The school also produced a British Pentathlon Champion in 2011.

Drama and music
The school GCSE and A Level groups have staged productions such as Grease, The Resistible Rise of Arturo Ui, West Side Story, The Royal Hunt of the Sun, Animal Farm, The Madness of King George, Grimm Tales, The Crucible, The Little Shop of Horrors and The Threepenny Opera. New productions have been staged, including some written by student and teachers such as The Letter of Marque (pronounced "Mark"), directed by Carrie Lee-Grey (SMOOSH) and written by Ashley Tomlin (Old Gravesendian and former Head of Middle School). There are a number of musical organisations at the school, including guitar and recorder clubs, a chamber orchestra and a choir.

Trips
Recent years have witnessed educational visits to France, Italy and Germany, including various exchanges, as well as other trips to places such as The Globe Theatre, Chessington World of Adventures, the Phoenix Theatre, Port Lymph Animal Park and The British Museum. Senior students have visited Bolivia, Peru, Mongolia, Zambia, Botswana, and China as part of the World Challenge Expeditions. Senior school members were stranded in Iceland with staff due to the 2010 eruptions of Eyjafjallajökull for a period of six days during a Geography trip. Ski trips take place to the Alps, Italy and Canada.  The school has also taken pupils to canoe down the Ardèche and to scuba dive in Gozo.

Motto and school song
The school motto, Consule Cunctis, was adopted in 1925 and whilst originally understood to mean "Do thou take thought for the good of all men", it is now translated as "take thought for everyone". Originally, the school song was "Forty Years On", the school song for Harrow School, but in 1926 two friends of the Headmaster wrote a new song, also called "Consule Cunctis". "Forty Years On" continued to be sung along with the new song at important dates in the school calendar, such as Speech Day, until the late-1940s. To reflect the ever-increasing numbers and diversity of the school, and particularly the inclusion of female students within the sixth form, the words have changed, in theory at least, from "four hundred fellows" to "one thousand students".

Head masters

1893–1898 James T. Dalladay (qv. Arthur James Dalladay)
1898–1924 Henry F.A. Wigley FCS
1924–1946 Revd Samuel Lister
1946–1963 William H.E. Stevens FRSA
1963–1968 Peter Arnold-Craft JP
1968–1974 Roy Cooke
1974–1977 James Brogden
1978–1985 Peter T. Sanderson
1985–2000 Peter J. Read
2000–2018 Geoffrey S. Wybar
2018–present Malcolm Moaby

Deputy head masters

1893–1898 Sidney A. Sworn
1898–1907 James T. Dalladay AMC
1907–1931 David Foster
1931–1936 Harold Law
1936–1958 Arthur Richards
1958–1964 Les C. Furley
1964–1973 Edwin W. Walker
1973–1977 Peter T. Sanderson DLC
1979–1986 John E. Edwards
1986–1990 Robin H. Curtis
1990–2013 Brian Simpson
2004–2008 Joanne L. Seymour
2015–2016 Malcolm Moaby
2019–present Sarah Tremain

Notable former pupils

Sir Derek Barton FRS (1918-1998), organic chemist and Nobel Prize laureate
George Box FRS (1919-2013), statistician, President of the American Statistical Association, 1978, President of the Institute of Mathematical Statistics, 1979
Sqn Ldr Robert Palmer VC DFC* (1920–1944)
David Brown DMus (1929–2014), Professor of Musicology, Southampton University, 1983-1989, leading Tchaikovsky specialist
Sir Richard Southwood DL FRS (1931–2005), Professor of Zoology and Vice-Chancellor of the University of Oxford, 1989-1993
Johnny Hills (born 1934), professional footballer,  Tottenham Hotspur FC
Brian Newbould (born 1936), Professor of Music, Hull University, 1979-2001
Janis Antonovics FRS (born 1942), Professor of Biology, University of Virginia, 1998–present, winner of the 1999 Sewall Wright Award
David Nicholls (1943–2008), professional cricketer, Kent CCC
David A. Cooke (born 1949), rugby player, Harlequins and England
Geoff Whitehorn (born 1951), guitarist and singer-songwriter, member of Procol Harum
Rt Revd Tony Porter (born 1952), Bishop of Sherwood, 2006–2020
Richard T. Russell (born 1952), author of BBC BASIC for Windows programming language
Paul Greengrass CBE (born 1955), BAFTA-winning and Academy Award-nominated film director
Alan Riach (born 1957), Professor of Scottish Literature, Glasgow University, 2001–present
Stephen Webster MBE (born 1960), jewellery designer
Cllr Mike Woodin (1965–2004), former principal spokesman for the Green Party of England and Wales and Oxford City Councillor
Simon Adams (Paul Ritter) (1966-2021), actor, Friday Night Dinner, Chernobyl, Quantum of Solace, Harry Potter and the Half-Blood Prince
Adrian Owen OBE (born 1966), Professor of Cognitive Neuroscience and Imaging, University of Western Ontario, Canada, 2010–present
Alex Beard (born 1967), Chief Executive Glencore UK 2007–2019
Neil McDonald (born 1967), chess grandmaster
Tan Dhesi (born 1978), Mayor of Gravesham, 2011-2012, Member of Parliament for Slough, 2017–present
Andrew Cave-Brown (born 1988), professional footballer, Leyton Orient FC
Sam Walker (born 1991), professional footballer, Reading FC
Fikayo Tomori (born 1997), professional footballer, AC Milan and England

Other
At the end of each academic year a school magazine, The Miltonian, is published. Generally it includes valedictories to leaving staff members, reviews of sporting seasons and drama productions, accounts of school trips and other events which took place during the previous year.

References

External links
Gravesend Grammar School website
Ofsted Report

Gravesend, Kent
Grammar schools in Kent
Educational institutions established in 1893
1893 establishments in England
People educated at Gravesend Grammar School
Academies in Kent
History of Gravesend, Kent